The list below, enumerates the selected sites of the Soviet forced labor camps (known in Russian as the "corrective labor camps") of the Gulag. Most of them served mining, construction, and timber works. It is estimated that for most of its existence, the Gulag system consisted of over 30,000 camps, divided into three categories according to the number of prisoners held. The largest camps consisted of more than 25,000 prisoners each, medium size camps held from 5,000 to 25,000 inmates, and the smallest, but most numerous labor camps operated with less than 5,000 people each. Even this incomplete list can give a fair idea of the scale of forced labor in the USSR.

Initially, the list of Gulag penal labor camps in the USSR was created in Poland from the personal accounts of labor camp detainees of Polish citizenship. It was compiled by the government of Poland for the purpose of regulation and future financial compensation for World War II victims, and published in a decree of the Council of Ministers of Poland.

Camp system operation
There were a number of particular categories of convicts that were imprisoned there including:
Any person convicted to a term of imprisonment of more than three years (all those convicted to less than three years were to be sent to "corrective labor colonies").
Opponents of the Soviet rule. Initially these were dubbed "class enemies" (White Army combatants, members of opposition parties, nobility, etc.). Later, when the full victory of the Revolution was declared and there were supposedly no more "class enemies" left, a more flexible term of the enemy of the people was introduced, as well as an infamous Article 58 (RSFSR Penal Code) that covered "counter-revolutionary activities".
Soviet combatants returned from captivity. As a rule they were held liable under Article 58.

The prisoners of war were generally imprisoned in special POW camps, which existed independently from the network of corrective labor camps, and were subordinated to a separate administrative apparatus within the NKVD (since 1946: MVD) called GUPVI. However, a fair number of POWs ended up in the regular camp system eventually. Unlike Gulag camps, located primarily in remote areas (mostly in Siberia), most of the POW camps after the war were located in the European part of the Soviet Union (with notablke exceptions of thee Japanese POW in the Soviet Union), where the prisoners worked on restoration of the country's infrastructure destroyed during the war: roads, railways, plants, etc., a topic of a separate article, POW labor in the Soviet Union. Polish citizens and members of other nationalities who were imprisoned at the Soviet forced labour camps during World War II worked also for the Soviet Army, digging trenches, employed in lumber and cement works, airport runway construction, and unloading of transport goods.

Main camp directorates with acronyms
 BAM: Baikalo-Amurskaya Magistral, Baikal-Amur Mainline (railway)
 BBK: Belomorsko-Baltiyskiy Kanal, White Sea-Baltic Canal
 ITL: "Ispravitelno-trudovoi lager'", corrective labor camp
 LO: "Lesoobyedinenie", Logging works complex
 CW: Construction Works
 CS: Construction Site
 GES: "Gidroelektrostantsiya", hydro-electric powerplant
 Dalstroy: Far East regional CW directorate
 Yeniseystroy: Yenisei River basin regional CW directorate
 SMU: "stroitelno-montazhnoe upravlenie",  Administration of construction and installation works
 NKVD: literally, the People's Commissariat of Internal Affairs
 MVD: literally, the Ministry of Internal Affairs
 UVD: literally, the Administration of Internal Affairs, subordinated to GUVD
 GUVD: literally, the Main Administration of Internal Affairs, renamed MVD
 NKV: literally, the People's Commissariat of Arms
 OITK: "Otdel ispravitelno-trudovykh koloniy", corrective labor colonies department
 OLP: "Otdel'ny lagerney punkt", separate camp point
 OGPU: "Ob'yedinennoe glavnoe politicheskoe upravlenie", United Main Political Administration
 PL: to mark sites that also detained Polish nationals
 SGU: "Spetsialʹnoye glavnoye upravleniye Glavspetstsvetmeta", Special Chief Directorate of Glavspetstsvetmet
 TMFM: Traitor of Motherland Family Member (Russian: ЧСИР: член семьи изменника Родины), a category of repressed designated for the family members of the person who was recognized as the Traitor of Motherland; some camps were specifically designated to this category.

GULAG
 GULAG: "Glavnoe Upravlenie Ispravitelno-trudovykh Lagerey", or The Chief Directorate of Corrective Labor Camps
 BAMLag: Directorate of BAM camps
 BBLag: Directorate of White Sea-Baltic Canal camps, refer to previously mentioned BBK
 GUAS:  "Glavnoe Upravleniye Aerodromnogo stroitelstva", Chief Directorate of airport construction
 GULGMP: "Glavnoe Upravleniye Lagerey (GUL) Gorno-Metallurgicheskoy Predpriyatiy", Chief Directorate of Camps in Mining and Metallurgical Enterprises
 GULLP: "GUL Lesnoy Promyshlennosti", Chief Directorate of Camps in Forest Industry
 GULTP: "GUL Tyazholoy Promyshlennosti", Chief Directorate of Camps in Heavy Industry
 GULGTS: "GUL Gidrotekhnicheskogo stroitelstva", Chief Directorate of Hydroelectric CW
 GULPS: "GUL Upraveleniye Promyshlennogo stroitel'stva", Chief Directorate of Industrial CW
 GULZhDS: "GUL Zheleznodorozhnogo stroitelstva", Chief Directorate of Railway CW
 GUSHOSDOR, GULShosDor, GULShDOR: "GUL Shosseynykh dorog", Chief Directorate of Camps in Highway CW
 Sevvostlag or SVITL (severo-vostochnye lagerya): Directorate of North-Eastern Camps, until 1939 was an independent system of labor camps outside of the main administration of camps, GULAG.
 USLON: "Upravlenie Severnykh Lagerey Osobogo Naznacheniya", Directorate of Northern Special-Significance Camps
 USKMITL: "Upravlenie Solovetskogo and Karelo-Murmanskikh ITL", Directorate of Solovki and Karelia-Murmansk Camps
 SLON: "Solovetski Lager Osobogo Naznachenia", Solovki Camp of Special Significance
 KhOZU: "Khozyaystvennoe upravlenie MVD", Economic Directorate of the MVD
 UITLK: "Upravleniye Ispravitelno-trudovykh Lagerey i Koloniy", Directorate of Corrective Labor Camps and Colonies
 USVITL: "Upravleniye Severo-Vostochnykh Ispravitelʹno-trudovykh Lagerey", Directorate of Northeast Corrective Labor Camps

Construction works
 Administration of corrective labor camps of "Apatit" industrial complex.
 General Administration of Petroleum Refinery and Synthetic Fuels Construction of MVD
 (PL) ITLs servicing CSs ## 6, 16, 18, 90, 100, 105, 106, 108, 141, 159, 211, 213, 247, 258, 263, 304, 313, 442, 447, 462, 496, 505, 506, 507, 508, 509, 510, 511, 513, 514, 514, 560, 565, 585, 600, 601, 620, 665, 770, 790, 791, 833, 855, 859, 865, 880, 882, 883, 885, 896, 907, 915, 940, 994 (PL)
 (PL) ITLs servicing GUShosDor CSs ## 1—8, 19 (PL)
 (PL) ITLs servicing SMU ## 41—53 (PL)
 Krasnoyarsk CS and ITL of Yeniseystroy (PL)
 ITL of Special CSs for Cellulose-Paper enterprises of Karelo-Finnish SSR (PL)
 ITL of CS for Arkhangelsk Cellulose-Paper Complex (PL)
 ITL of CSs for hydroelectric power plants on the Biya River (PL)
 ITL of CSs for Vladimir hydroelectric power plant (PL)
 ITL for CSs ##1, 2, 3 of Bashkirian Petroleum Plants Special CW (Bashspecneftestroy) (PL)
 ITL for CSs ##1, 2, 3 of Tatarstan Petroleum Plants Special CW (Tatspecneftestroy) (PL)
 ITL for CS of the Kazan petroleum refinery
 ITL for CSs of hydroelectric power plants on the upper Oka River (PL)
 ITL for CSs of Transcaucasian metallurgical enterprises (PL)
 ITL for CSs of Znamienitaya dam and sluice (PL)
 ITL for CSs of Volga-Don canal (PL)
 ITL for CSs of Krasnoyarsk-Yeniseysk railway (PL)
 ITL for CSs of Karaganda basin open-cast coal mines (PL)
 Taishet Construction Works

Continued from the Polish Dziennik Ustaw complete listing of NKVD camps with Poles.
 Alluvaysky CS and ITL (PL)
 Yensky CS and ITL (PL)
 Matkozensky CS and ITL (PL)
 Yanstroy ITL of Dalstroy (PL)

234) ITŁ Zarządu Dróg Bitych Dalstroju,

A

Akhtuba ITL (Akhtublag)
Akhunsky ITL (Akhunlag)
ALZhIR, camp for wives of "traitors of the Motherland" (АЛЖИР, Акмолинский лагерь жён изменников Родины), an example of a morose Gulag wordplay: Алжир is Algeria (in Siberia...)
Aktyubinsky ITL (Aktyubinlag)
Aldan ITL of Dalstroy
Aldansky ITL (Aldanlag)
Alluayvskoe CS and ITL (PL)
Altaysky ITL (Altaylag)
Amgunsky ITL (Amgunlag)
Amursky ITL (Amurlag)
Amur Railway ITL (Amurlag)
Lower Amur ITL
Angarsky ITL (Angarlag)
Angrensky ITL (Angrenlag)
Aralichevsky ITL (Aralichevlag)
Arkhangelsky ITL (Arkhbumlag; renamed ITL and construction of Arkhangelsk TsBK in 1940)
Arkhangelsky transit point OGPU (Arkhperpunkt)
Astrakhansky ITL (Astrakhanlag)
Avrotransportny ITL of Dalstroy (Translag)
Azovsky ITL (Azovlag)
Azovskoe LO (Azovlag)

Continued from the Polish Dziennik Ustaw complete listing of NKVD camps with Poles.
Archpierpunkt
Atbasarski ITL

B
Bakalsky ITL (Bakallag)
Bakovsky ITL (Bakovlag)
Balaganskoe LO
Balakhninsky ITL (Balaklag)
Baleysky ITL (Baleylag)
Bamlag (Baikal-Amur Mainline) ITLs
Barashevsky ITL and GULAG industrial complex (Barashevlag)
BBK (White Sea-Baltic Canal) ITLs
Belogorsky ITL (Belogorlag)
Belomorstroy and ITL (Belbaltlag)
Belorechensky ITL (Belrechlag)
Belozersk LO
Bereznikovsky ITL (Bereznyaklag, Berezlag)
Berlag (MVD Special Camp No. 5)
Beskudnikovskoe Special LO
Bezymyansky ITL (Bezymyanlag)
Birsky ITL (Birlag)
Bodaybinsky ITL (Bodaybinlag)
Bogoslovsky ITL and construction of aluminum plant (Bogoslovag)
Borsky ITL (Borlag)
Bratsky ITL and Tayshet construction
Buchenwald called Special camp No 2 of the NKVD. Part of the GULAG from 1948 to 1950; transferred to GDR control by Kruglov.
Bukachachinsky ITL (Bukachachlag)
 , concentrating on BAM construction
Butugychag, Uranium mine and Special ITL (Magadan Oblast), headed by Dalstroy, later, at closing, Sevvostlag.    Coordinates: 61 18'05.65" N  149 02'53.34" E

Continued from the Polish Dziennik Ustaw complete listing of NKVD camps, and the Russian Карта ГУЛАГа - Мемориал 
Bakalsky ITL
Bakovsky ITL
Baleysky ITL
Balachlag
Barashevsky ITL and Industrial Complex of GULAG (Barashevlag; transferred to Dubravnogo Camp in 1954)
Baydarsky ITL (Baydarlag)
Bazhenovsky ITL (Bazhenovlag)
Belokorovichsky camp of the OITK NKVD of BSSR
Beregovoy Camp (MVD Special Camp No. 5, Berlag)
Berezovsky ITL (1947-1948, Berezovlag)
Berezovsky ITL (1954-1956, Berezovlag)
Berezovsky ITL of Northern directorate of GULZhDS (Berezovlag)
Bezymyansky ITL (Bezymyanlag)
Bobrovskoe LO (Bobrovlag)
Borsky ITL (Borlag)
Burepolomsky ITL (Burepolomlag)

C
Central Asian ITL (Sazlag, Sazulon, Central Asian camps, Directorate of Central Asian labor camp and colonies of the NKVD of the Uzbek SSR, UITLK of the NKVD of the Uzbek SSR)
Chapayevsky ITL (Chapayevskoe construction, Chapayevstroy, ITL Directorate of Restoration Works; subordinated to Chelyabmetallurgstroy)
Chaunsky ITL of Dalstroy
Chaun-Chukotsky ITL of Dalstroy
Cheboksarsky ITL (Cheboksarlag; became an independent LO as part of Tagilsky ITL in 1943)
Chelyabinsky ITL (Chelyablag; former ITL Chelyametallurgstroy)
Cherepovetsky ITL (Cherepovetslag)
Chernogorsky ITL (Chernogorlag)
Chernogorsky Special ITL
Chernoistochinsky ITL (Chernoistochlag)
Chukotsky ITL of Dalstroy (ITL Chukotstroy, Chukotstroylag, Chukotsky ITL USVITL, LO Chukotstroy)
Construction 6 and ITL (transferred to Nizhne-Amur ITL in 1953)
Construction 16 and ITL (renamed Kitoysky ITL in 1953)
Construction 18 and ITL (renamed Khakassky ITL in 1953)
Construction 90 and ITL (formerly ITL Spetsstroy; renamed Construction 560 and ITL in 1949)
Construction 105 and ITL (reorganized into Construction 106 and ITL in 1940)
Construction 106 and ITL
Construction 108 and ITL
Construction 159 and ITL (ITL Construction 159)
Construction 200 and Luzhsky ITL (Luzhlag)
Construction 201 and ITL (Nikolaevsky ITL)
Construction 210 and ITL
Construction 211 and ITL
Construction 213 and ITL (Nakhodka Bay)
Construction 247 and ITL (renamed Kuznetsky ITL in 1953)
Construction 258 and ITL (ITL and Construction 258)
Construction 263 and ITL (Sovgavan, ITL Construction 263)
Construction 304 and ITL
Construction 313 and ITL (renamed Bobrovskoe LO in 1953)
Construction 352 and ITL (Noginsky ITL, ITL and Construction 352)
Construction 384 and ITL (Glazovlag, Glazovsky ITL)
Construction 442 and ITL (renamed Gorodskoe LO in 1953)
Construction 447 and ITL
Construction 462 and ITL (renamed Azovsky ITL in 1953)
Construction 496 and ITL (renamed Construction 258 and ITL in 1949)
Construction 500
Construction 505 and ITL GULZhDS (renamed Selenginsky ITL in 1953)
Construction 505 and ITL GULPS (renamed Construction 585 and ITL in 1949)
Construction 506 and ITL
Construction 507 and ITL (became part of Nizhamurlag in 1953)
Construction 508 and ITL (renamed Ulminsky ITL in 1953)
Construction 509 and ITL (transferred to Belorechensky ITL in 1953)
Construction 510 and ITL
Construction 511 and ITL
Construction 513 and ITL
Construction 514 and ITL (renamed Krasnogorsky ITL in 1953)
Construction 514 and ITL GULZhDS
Construction 560 and ITL (transferred to Construction 565 and ITL in 1952)
Construction 565 and ITL (renamed Bakovsky ITL in 1953)
Construction 585 and ITL (renamed Belogorsk ITL in 1953)
Construction 600 and ITL (renamed Kamensky ITL in 1953)
Construction 601 and ITL (renamed Voroninosky ITL in 1953)
Construction 612 and ITL (renamed Podgorny ITL in 1953)
Construction 620 and ITL (renamed Podlesnoe LO in 1953)
Construction 621 and ITL (ITL at construction department for construction of mining department No. 10)
Construction 665 and ITL
Construction 713 and ITL (Noginsky ITL; renamed Construction 352 and ITL in 1949)
Construction 730 and ITL (Belozerskoye LO)
Construction 770 and ITL
Construction 790 and ITL (renamed Yermakovskoye LO in 1953)
Construction 791 and ITL
Construction 833 and ITL (renamed Construction 620 and ITL in 1949
Construction 855 and ITL
Construction 859 and ITL (renamed Construction 247 and ITL in 1949)
Construction 865 and ITL (renamed Construction 313 and ITL in 1949)
Construction 880 and ITL (renamed Construction 505 and ITL GULPS in 1949)
Construction 881 and ITL (renamed Construction 915 and ITL in 1949)
Construction 882 and ITL (renamed Construction 940 and ITL in 1949)
Construction 896 and ITL (renamed Construction 665 and ITL in 1949)
Construction 904 and ITL (renamed Construction 384 and ITL in 1949)
Construction 907 and ITL (renamed Construction 447 and ITL in 1949)
Construction 915 and ITL
Construction 940 and ITL
Construction 994 and ITL (renamed ITL and construction of mining and metallurgical enterprises in 1950)
Construction 1001 and ITL
Construction 1418 and ITL (renamed Construction 514 and ITL in 1949)
Construction-operating control No. 11 and ITL
Construction GUShOSDORA MVD No. 1 – No. 8 and ITL
Construction GUShOSDORA MVD No. 17 and ITL
Construction GUShOSDORA MVD No. 19 and ITL
Construction GUShOSDORA NKVD No. 1 – No. 4 and ITL

Continued from the Polish Dziennik Ustaw complete listing of NKVD camps with Poles.
Chistyungsky health camp (Chistyunlag, Chistyungsky invalid ITL); reorganized in LO UITLK UMVD for the Altai Region in 1951)

D
Dalniy Camp (MVD Special Camp No. 11)
Darasunskoe LO (Vershino-Darasunskoe LO)
Dmitrovsky ITL (Dmitlag; reorganized into its own Gulag district in 1938)
Donlag (Don)
Dorlag ITL of Dalstroy
Dorozhny ITL of Dalstroy
Dubogorskoe LO
Dubravlag (MVD Special Camp No. 3; became a Soviet penitentiary in 1960 and a Russian prison in 2005)
Dzhezkagansky ITL (Dzhezkazganlag; reorganized into LO Karagandinskogo ITL in 1943)
Dzhidinsky ITL (Dzhidinlag, Dzhidlag)
Dzhugdzhursky ITL (Dzhugdzhurlag)

Continued from the Polish Dziennik Ustaw complete listing of NKVD camps with Poles.
Daleki Camp

E
 Eastern Administration of Lead Mining and ITL of Yeniseistroy
 Eastern ITL in construction 500
 Eastern railway ITL (Vostoklag, Vostlag)
 Eastern Urals ITL (Vosturallag)

F
Far East ITL

G
Gagarinskoe LO (Gagarinsky ITL, Gagarlag)
Gdovsky ITL (Gdovlag)
Glazovsky LO (Glazovlag, LO at Construction 384)
Gorny Camp (MVD Special Camp No. 2, Gorlag; merged back into Norillag in 1954)
Gornaya Shoriya ITL
Gornoshersky ITL (Gornoshorlag)
Gorodskoe LO (Gorlag)
Guryevsky ITL (Gurlag)
Gusino-Ozersky ITL (Gusinoozerlag)

I
Ilimsky Special ITL
Indigirsky ITL of Dalstroy
Intinsky ITL (Intalag; reorganized into Minlag in 1948)
Inza- Syzran ITL
ITL Aldan road construction authority of Dalstroy
ITL and 10th field construction NKVD
ITL and Bashkirian Petroleum Plant (Bashspetneftestroy) construction No. 1 – No. 4 (PL)
ITL and Tatarstan Petroleum Plant (Tatspetsneftestroy) construction No. 1 & No. 2 (PL)
ITL and "V-1" construction
ITL and aerodrome construction
ITL and Arkhangelsk TsBK construction
ITL and Borovichevskoy GES construction 
ITL and Buyskikh GES construction
ITL and construction of Aktovrakskogo industrial complex
ITL and construction of coal mine No. 4 of the Karaganda region
ITL and construction of Gulag in Dmitrov District
ITL and construction of Gulag in Khimki District (Khimkinsky ITL, Khimlag)
ITL and construction of industrial complex No. 7 (renamed Construction 907 and ITL in 1947)
ITL and construction of iron ore mine
ITL and construction of Kazan oil refining plant (Kazanneftestroy)
ITL and construction of Krasnoyarsk–Yeniseisk railway 
ITL and construction of Mstinskikh GES
ITL and construction of NKV plant No. 8
ITL and construction of special district (Stroylag)
ITL and construction of Stalinist pumping stations
ITL and construction of state farms and silos (Atbasarsky ITL)
ITL and construction of southeast harbor (ITL construction of South harbor)
ITL and construction of special region
ITL and construction of Transcaucasian metallurgical plant (Zakmetallurgstroy, ZMS)
ITL and construction of upper Ob hydroelectric plant
ITL and construction of upper Samgorsky irrigation system, Tbilisi
ITL and construction of Vladimirskoy GES (PL)
ITL and construction of Volga-Don waterway (Volgodonstroy)
ITL "Apatit" industrial complex (merged into Belorechensky LO in 1953)
ITL "ASh"
ITL Berelekhskaya District Directorate geological exploration of Dalstroy
ITL Board of Dalstroy
ITL "BZh"
ITL Chelyametallurgstroy (Chelyabinsky ITL, Chelyablag)
ITL for construction of iron mines (Zhelezlag; renamed Polyansky ITL in 1953)
ITL for construction of mining and metallurgical enterprises (renamed ITL for construction of iron mines in 1951)
ITL for construction of Solikamsk TsBK
ITL for construction of Usolsky mining equipment plant (renamed Usolsky ITL SGU in 1949)
ITL Dalstroy Roads Board
ITL Dmitrov mechanical plant
ITL "DS" of Yeniseistroy (renamed Taezhny ITL in 1953)
ITL "DT"
ITL "DYu" (absorbed into ITL "GA" in 1953)
ITL "EL" (ITL for geological exploration expedition; renamed Ostrovskoe LO in 1953)
ITL "EM" (ITL and construction of coal mine; renamed Dubogorskoe LO in 1953)
ITL "EN" (ITL and oil exploration expedition; renamed Mostovskoe LO in 1953)
ITL "EO" (ITL and Mine Construction; renamed Gagarinskoe LO in 1953)
ITL "EShch"
ITL "GA"
ITL "GB" (absorbed into ITL "Eshch" in 1953)
ITL "IN"
ITL industrial complex No. 6
ITL industrial complex No. 9
ITL industrial complex No. 11
ITL "KA"
ITL Kolyma-Indigirka river shipping of Dalstroy
ITL Motor Transport Dalstroy
ITL "NL"
ITL No. 17 GUShOSDOR
ITL Oboronstroe
ITL Omskstroy (Omsky ITL, Omlag)
ITL "Promzhilstroy" of Dalstroy
ITL refining plant No. 169 (Affinazhstroy)
ITL special construction site No. 881
ITL Spetsstroy (renamed Construction 90 and ITL in 1947)
ITL of special construction
ITL Uglich plant, bridge construction No. 4 GUShOSDOR
ITL Usolgidroles
ITL "VCh"
ITL Volgostroya (Volzhsky ITL, Volgolag)
ITL Yanstroy of Dalstroy (PL) (Khandygsky ITL USVITLa, ITL "Yanstroy", Yanstroylag, LO Yanstroya)
ITL "Yeshch"
ITL "Yeya"
ITL "ZhK"
ITL "ZhR"
Ivdelsky ITL (Ivdellag)

Continued from the Polish Dziennik Ustaw complete listing of NKVD camps with Poles.

ITL and construction of Ore Mine (ITŁ i Budowa Kopalni Rudy)
ITL and coal mine construction (ITŁ i Budowa Kopalni Węgla)
ITL and the petroleum expedition (ITŁ i Ekspedycja Poszukująca Ropy Naftowej)
ITL at construction of Karagandastroy (ITŁ przy Budowie Karagandażyłstroju)
ITL at construction board of ore mine directorate No. 10 (ITŁ przy Zarządzie Budowy Dyrekcji Kopalń Rudy nr 10)
ITL Belomorstroy (ITŁ Biełomorstroju)
ITL Construction of Mining and Metallurgical Enterprises (ITŁ Budowy Przedsiębiorstw Górniczo-Metalurgicznych)
ITL Construction of Southern Harbor (ITŁ Budowy Przystani Południowej)
ITL Geological-Exploration Expedition (ITŁ Ekspedycji Geologiczno-Poszukiwawczej)
ITL Industrial and Housing Construction (ITŁ Budownictwa Przemysłowego i Mieszkaniowego)
ITL Iron Ore Mine Construction (ITŁ Budowy Kopalń Rudy Żelaza)
ITL Krasnoyarsk Affiliation Institute (ITŁ Krasnojarskiego Zakładu Afinacji)
ITL of Yansky Mining and Industry Directorate (ITŁ Jańskiego Zarządu Górniczo-Przemysłowego)
ITL of Directorate of Dalstroy Auxiliary Farms (ITŁ Zarządu Gospodarstw Pomocniczych Dalstroju)
Ozyorny Camp

K
Kalachevsky ITL (ITL and Construction of Volga-Don Shipping Canal, ITL and Construction of Volga-Don connecting canal)
Kaluzhsky ITL (ITL and construction of Moscow-Kiev highway, Kaluglag)
Kamensky ITL (1942–1944; Kamenlag, Novo-Kamensky ITL)
Kamensky ITL (1953–1954; Kamenlag)
Kamyshovy Camp (MVD Special Camp No. 10; Kamyshovlag, Kamyshlag)
Kandalakshinsky ITL (ITL and Construction of Kandalakshinsky aluminum plant, Kandalakshstroy; transferred to Karagandinsky ITL in 1948)
Karagandazhilstroy and ITL
Karagandinsky ITL (Karlag)
Karakumsky ITL (Karakumlag; ITL Sredazgidrostroy; ITL and construction of the Main Turkmen Canal)
Kargopolsky ITL, Yertsevo (КАРГОПОЛЬЛАГ)
Kaspiysky ITL (ITL at directorate of Construction No. 2 GUAS, NKVD Building No. 2, Kaspiylag)
Kazakhstansky ITL OGPU (Kazlag)
Keksgolmsky ITL (ITL Special construction of pulp and paper objects of the Karelian-Finnish SSR, ITL special construction on the Karelian isthmus, Keksgolmlag))
Kemerovozhilstroy and ITL
Kengir
Khabarovsky ITL
Khakassky ITL
Khakasskoe LO
Khimkinsky OLP 
Kimpersaysky ITL (Kimpersaylag)
Kirovlag ITL
Kitoisky ITL (Kitoylag)
Kizelovsky ITL (Kizellag)
Klyuchevsky ITL (ITL and construction of the Klyuchev complex; Klyuchevlag)
Kochkarskoe LO (Kochkarlag)
Kokshinsky ITL
Kolsky ITL and special construction 33 (Kollag; Kolskogo ITL and UNKVD colonies for the Murmansk region; transferred to Construction 106 and ITL in 1941)
Koslansky ITL (Koslanlag)
Kosvinsky ITL (Kosvinlag, Kosvinstroy)
Kotlassky GULZhDS department
Kotlassky transit and trans shipment point GULAG
Kotlassky agricultural ITL (Kotlaslag)
Kotlassky agricultural LO
Kovrovsky ITL (ITL and Construction of the Nizhne-Klyazminskaya GES, ITL and Construction of Kovrovskaya GES; Kovrovges)
Krasnogorsky ITL (Krasnogorlag)
Krasnoyarskoe construction and ITL of Yeniseistroy
Krasnoyarsky ITL (Kraslag)
Krasnoyarsk Office of Special Construction and ITL, mailbox 138
Kuloisky ITL (КУЛОЙЛАГ)
Kuneevsky ITL (ITL and construction of Kuibyshev GES)
Kungursky ITL
Kuryanovsky ITL
Kusinsky ITL (Kusinlag)
Kuzbassky ITL (Kuzbasszhilstroy, Kuzbasslag)
Kuznetsky ITL (Kuznetslag)

L
Likovsky ITL and construction 204 (Likovlag)
LO at Voroshilov plant
LO at "Sacca and Vanzetti" sovkhoz (Cherdaklag)
LO Central Hospital, Dalstroy
LO Lower Indigirka district exploration Dalstroy Directorate (LO Ozhogino)
Lobvinsky ITL (Lobvinlag, Lobvinstroy, ITL and construction of Lobvin hydrolysis plant)
Lokchimsky ITL (Lokchimlag)
Lower Amur ITL (Nizhamurlag, Nizhne-Amurlag, Nizhneamurlag)
Lower Don ITL (Nizhnedonlag, ITL and construction of irrigation and hydraulic structures)
Lower Volga ITL (merged with Saratovsky ITL and Volgozheldorstroy Administration in 1942 to form Privolzhsky ITL)
Lugovoy Camp (MVD Special Camp No. 9, Luglag)
Luzhsky ITL and construction 200 (Luzhlag, Construction 200 and ITL)
Lysogorskoe LO (Lysogorlag, LO at Construction 621)

M
Continued from the Polish Dziennik Ustaw complete listing of NKVD camps with Poles.
Magadansky ITL, Dalstroy (Maglag)
Mariysky ITL
Makarovskoe LO (Makarlag; transferred to Kuznetskogo ITL)
Markovsky ITL (ITL and construction of the Northern Water Pipeline station, Sevvodstroy)
Martynovsky ITL (ITL and construction of Volgodostroy irrigation facilities; merged with Tslimlyansky ITL to form Nizhne-Donskoy ITL in 1952)
Matkozhnenskoe construction and ITL (Matkozhlag)
Maykainskoe LO
Medvezhiegorsk health camp (Medvezhegorlag, Medvezhyegorsk ITL, Medvezhyegorsk invalid ITL)
Mekhrennsky ITL (Mekhrenlag)
Mineevskoe LO KhOZU MVD
Mineralny Camp (Minlag, Special Camp No. 1, became Mineralny ITL in 1954)
Minusinskoe LO SGU
Molotovsky ITL (ITL Molotovstroy, Molotovlag)
Monchegorsky ITL and construction of "Severonikel" plant (Monchegolag)
Moskovsko-Ugolny ITL (Mosugol)
Moskovsky Logging ITL (Mosleslag)
Mostovskoe LO (Mostovlag, Mostovsky ITL)

N 
Niebitdaski ITŁ
Neftestroylag
Nemnyrsky ITL (ITL at the "Aldanlyuda" trust, Nemnyrlag)
Nerchinsky ITL (Nerchinlag)
Nerchinskoe LO (Nerchinskoe agricultural LO)
Nikolayevsky ITL
Nizhegorodsky ITL
Norilsky ITL (Norillag, Norilstroy; June 25, 1935 to August 22, 1956)
Northern OGPU special purpose camps (USEVLON, Sevlag, SEVLON)
North ITL Dalstroy (Sevlag, Northern ITL USVITLa)
North Directorate ITL and construction 503 (Северная Совет)
North Railway ITL (Sevzheldorlag; merged with Severo-Pechorsky ITL to form Pechorsky ITL in 1950)
Novokimensky ITL
Novo-Tambovsky ITL (Novotambovlag)
Nyrobsky ITL (Nyroblag)

O
Obsky ITL
Obsky ITL and construction 501 (Obskoe upr. GULZhDS, ITL at construction 501, Construction 501; part of camp liquidated and remainder became a portion of Pechorsk ITL in 1954)
Olkhovsky health camp (Olkhovlag, Olkhovsky ITL, Olkhovsky invalid ITL)
OLP construction building No. 1 GULAG NKVD
Omsky ITL and construction 166 (Omlag)
Omsukchansky ITL Dalstroy (Omsukchanskoe LO, Omsukchansky ITL USVITL, Omsukchanlag)
Onezhsky ITL (Oneglag)
Opoksky ITL (ITL construction of the Opoksky hydroelectric complex, ITL and construction of the Opoksky hydroelectric complex, Opokstroy, Opoklag)
Orlovsky ITL (Orlovlag)
Ostrovskoye LO (Ostrovsky ITL, Ostrovlag)
Ozerny Camp (Ozerny ITL, Ozerlag, MVD Special Camp No. 7)

P
Paninskoe LO (Paninlag)
Pavlovdarsky ITL (Pavlodarlag)
Pavlovskoe LO
Pechorsky ITL (Pechorlag)
Perevalny ITL (Perevallag; transferred to Nizhne-Amursky ITL in 1945)
Peschany Camp (MVD Special Camp No. 8, Peschanlag, Peschany ITL) 
Podgorny ITL (Podgorlag)
Podlesnoe LO (Podleslag)
Podolsky ITL (Podollag)
Polyansky ITL (Polyanlag)
Ponyshsky ITL (Ponyslag)
Prikaspisky ITL and construction 107 (Construction 107)
Primorsky ITL (Primorskoe LO, Primorlag; 1947-1953)
Primorsky ITL Dalstroy (Primorlag, Primlag, Primorskoe LO)
Primorsky railway ITL and construction 206 (Primorlag)
Primorsky district Dalstroy (Primorsky district of Sevvostlag)
Privolzhsky ITL (Privolzhlag)
Prorvinsky ITL (Prorvlag)
Przełęczowy ITŁ
Pudozhgorsky ITL (Pudozhstroy, ITL and construction of the Pudozhgorsk metallurgical complex)
Pudozhskoe LO

R
Raychikhinsky ITL (Raychikhlag)
Rechnoy Camp (MVD Special Camp No. 6, Rechlag)
Rudbaykalstroy and ITL (ITL Rudbakalstroy)
Rybinsky ITL (Rybinlag)

S
Continued from the Russian Карта ГУЛАГа - Мемориал listing of NKVD camps, and the Polish Dziennik Ustaw listing of camps.

Sakhalinsky ITL (САХАЛИНСКИЕ ИТЛ; Sakhalinlag, Sakhalinstroy)
Samarsky ITL and Kuibyshev hydrosystem construction (Samarsky ITL, Samarlag)
Saransky ITL and construction GULZhDS (Saransky ITL, Saranstroy, Sarantstroy)
Saratovsky ITL (Saratovlag, Saratovstroy, 1942; merged with Nizhne-Volzhsky ITL and Volgozheldorstroy Administration in 1942 to form Privolzhsky ITL)
Saratovsky ITL (ITL at Saratovstroy, Saratovlag; 1946-1956)
Sarovsky ITL
Sarovsky special quarantine camp OGPU
Segezhsky ITL (Segezhlag)
Selenginsky ITL (Selenginlag)
Severo-Dvinsky ITL (Sevdvinlag)
Severo-Kuzbassky ITL (Sevkuzbasslag)
Severo-Pechorsky (Sevpechlag, Pechora railway ITL, Pechora ITL, Pechorstroy, Pechorlag)
Severo-Vostochny ITL (Northeast ITL, Sevvostlag, Dalstroy ITL)
Severo-Uralsky ITL (Sevurallag)
Shakhtinsky ITL (Shakhtlag)
Shchugorsky ITL (Shchugorugol, Shchugorlag)
Sheksninsky ITL GULGTS
Sheksninsky ITL MVD (Sheksninlag; merged with Vytegorsky ITL into Volgo-Baltisky ITL in 1952)
Shirokovsky ITL (Shirokstroy, Shirok-Vilukhstroy, Shiroklag; became Kosvinsky ITL in 1949)
Shosdorlag (Ushosdorlag, Ushosstroylag)
Shozhemsky ITL
Sibirsky ITL (SIBULON, Siblag)
Solikamsky health camp (Solikamozdorlag, Solikamsky invalid ITL)
Solikamsky ITL 
Solovetsky ITL OGPU (Solovetsky special purpose camps, Solovetsky special forced labor camp OGPU, SLON, SLAG, Solovetsky and Karelo-Murmansk camps, SKMITL)
Soroksky ITL (СОРОКЛАГ)
Sosnovsky ITL (Sosnovlag; formed out of LO 5 and 7 of Kuznetsky ITL in 1954 and rolled back into Kuznetsky ITL in 1956)
Southern ITL (Yuzhlag)
Southern ITL at construction 505 GULZhDS (Yuzhlag)
Southeast ITL
Southwest ITL Dalstroy (Yugo-Zapadnoe LO, Yuzlag, Yugo-Zapadnoe LO USVITLa)
Southwest Mining Authority and ITL Yeniseystroy Directorate
Sredne-Belsky ITL (Srednebellag)
Stalingradsky ITL (Stalingradlag; renamed Lower Volga ITL in 1942)
Staroselskoe LO (Starosellag)
Stepnoy Camp (Steplag, MVD Special Camp No. 4, Stepnoy ITL)
Stepnovskoe LO
Sukhodolskoye LO (Sukhodolsky ITL)
Sukhanovo
Svirsky ITL (Svirlag)
Sviyazhskoe LO (LO at the Sviyazh plant number 1 GULZhDS)
Svobodnensky ITL (Svobodlag)
Syzransky ITL (Inza-Syzransky ITL, Inzasyzranlag, Syzranlag)

T
Tagilsky ITL (Nizhnetagilsky ITL, Tagillag, Tagilstroy)
Taiga ITL (Taezhlag)
Taiga Mining Authority and ITL Yeniseystroy Directorate (ITL PO Box 55)
Takhtamygdinskoe LO
Tavdinsky ITL (Tavdinlag)
Tavseevsky ITL (ITL and construction of the Taseevsky mine)
Tayshetsky ITL GULAG
Tayshetsky ITL GULZhDS (Tayshetstroy)
Tayshetsky ITL UITLK UNKVD in Irkutsk region (Tayshetlag, Tayshetsky NKVD camp)
Temnikovsky ITL (Temlag; merged into Dubravlag in 1948)
Tenkinsky ITL Dalstroy (Tenlag, Tenkinsky ITL USVITLa)
Tikhvin ITL (Tikhvinlag)
Togulym
Tomsky ITL (ITL "A" OITK UMVD in the Tomsk region)

Transit LO Dalstroy (Transit-transfer OLP)
Tsimlyansky ITL (Construction and ITL of the Tsimlyansk hydroelectric complex, ITL at the SU of the Tsimlyansk hydroelectric complex; merged with Martynovsky ITL into ITL and construction of irrigation and hydraulic structures in 1952)
Tugachinsky ITL (Tugachlag; absorbed into Krasnoyarsky ITL in 1953)
Tuimsky Mining Authority and ITL Yeniseystroy Directorate
Tuymazinsky ITL (Tuymazinlag)
Tyrnov-Auzsky plant and ITL

U
Ukhtinsko-Pechorsky ITL
Ukhta expedition OGPU
Ukhto-Izhemsky ITL
Ulenskoe Mining Authority and ITL
Ulminsky ITL (Ulminlag)
Umaltinsky ITL (Umaltlag, Umaltynskoe Mining Administration of the NKVD)
Unzhensky ITL (Unzhlag)
Upper Izhma ITL
Uralsky ITL
Urgalsky ITL and construction GULZhDS
Usolsky ITL
Usolsky ITL SGU
Ust-Borovsky ITL
Ust-Kutsky ITL and transshipment base Dalstoy
Ust-Kutskoe LO
Ust-Vymsky ITL
Ust-Vymsky ITL OGPU

V
 Vaninsky ITL of Dalstroy (Vaninlag, ITL and transshipment base in Vanino Bay, Vanino transit-forwarding camp of Dalstroy)
 Vaninsky transit camp (Vaninsky ITL)
 Varnavinsky ITL
 Vaygach expedition OGPU (Vaygachsky OLP)
 Verkne-Izhemsky ITL (Verkhizhemlag, Verkhneizhemlag)
 Verkne-Saldinsky ITL
 Vershina-Darasun ITL
 Vetluzhsky ITL (Vetlag)
 Vishersky ITL (Vislag, Viserlag)
 Vladivostoksky ITL (Directorate of Vladivostok ITL and colonies of Primorsky Krai, Vladlag)
 Vladivostok Transit Site of Dalstroy (:ru:Владперпункт ( Vladperpunkt, Владивосто́кский пересы́льный пу́нкт Дальстро́я), Vladivostok)
  ("Watershed Camp", MVD Special Camp No. 12)
 Volga ITL of hydrosystem construction (Volgolag, Volgostroy)
 Volga ITL MVD (Volgolag, Volgostroy)
 Volga railway ITL (Volgolag)
 Volga-Baltic ITL (see Volga–Baltic Waterway)
 Vorkutlag (Vorkuto-Pechora ITL, Vorkutpechlag, Vorkutinsky ITL, Vorkutstroy)
 Voroninsky ITL (Voroninlag, Voroninskoe LO), Tomsk Oblast
 Vyazemsky ITL (Vyazemlag, Directorate of construction and Vyazemlaga GUShOSDOR)
 Vytegorsky ITL (Vytegorstroy, Vytegorlag; merged with Shekshinsky ITL into Volgo-Baltysky ITL in 1952)
 Vytegorsky ITL NKVD (Vytegorstroy, Vytegorlag)
 Vyartsilsky ITL (Vyartsillag, Vyartsilsky ITL and metallurgical plant)
 Vyatsky ITL (Vyatlag)

Y
Yagrinsky ITL and construction 203 (Yagrinlag)
Yansky Construcion ITL, Yanstroylag, Исправи́тельно-трудово́й ла́герь Янстро́я Дальстро́я (Янсстройла́г) 
Yansky ITL of Dalstroy (Yanlag, ITL of the Yansky mining department, Yansky ITL USVITLa, Yanskoe LO, Исправительно-трудовой лагерь Янского горнопромышленного управления, Янское лагерное отделение)
Yansky Mining Directorate and ITL of Dalstroy
Yeniseysky ITL SGU (Yeniseylag)
Yeniseysky ITL (Directorate of Yenisei labor camp and colonies, Yeniseylag)
Yeniseysky ITL and construction 503 (Yeniseyzheldorlag)
Yenskoe construction and ITL (Yenlag, ЕНСКОЕ СТРОИТЕЛЬСТВО И ИТЛ; Енлаг)
Yermakovskoye LO (Ермаковское, Krasnoyarsk Krai; Yermakovlag)
Yugorsky ITL and construction 300 (Khanty–Mansia; Yugorlag, Construction 300)
South Kuzbass ITL (Yuzhkuzbasslag)

Z
Continued from the Polish complete listing of NKVD camps with Poles.
Zaimandrovsky ITL (Zaimandrovskoe construction and ITL, Zaimandrovlag)
Zapadny ITL (Zaplag, Zapadnoe GPU and ITL, Zapadny ITL USVITLa)
Zapadny railway ITL (Western Railway ITL)
Zapolyarny ITL and construction 301 (Zapolyarlag, Polyarny ITL)
Zapolyarny ITL and construction 503 (Zapolyarlag, Construction 503)
Zhigalovskoe LO

References

External links
Interactive map of Gulag. The Memorial Society, Russia.
List of Gulag camps. The Memorial Society, Russia.